The Tombstones of Duke Momčilo are a group of three medieval tombstones about 5 km to the South-East from the center of Teslić in Bosnia and Herzegovina.

The exact location of the tombstones is in Brkića Potok, a sub-village of Vrućica. They are situated on a hill, on south-western sides od Stražbenica hill.

The locals named the tombstones as Duke Momčilo's tombstones and they believe that they are tombstones of the duke, his wife and their child. No historical or archeological research confirmed that there ever was any Duke reigning the area, nor there was any other ruler named Momčilo.

The tombstones are not under care of any official authority. No research concluded their age or origin.

Sources
 Petar Bogunović: Iz usorskog kraja i okoline
 Boško Petrović: Vojvoda Momčilo

Rock art in Bosnia and Herzegovina
Bogomilism